Munnawar Masoom is an Indian singer of qawwali.

Early life
Munnawar Masoom was born in Bhopal, Madhya Pradesh, India.

Career
Munnawar Masoom is popular for his song Husne Muhabbat ka ada. He is known for his intense, powerful, energetic style and his rendering of pieces of the celebrated Sufi mystic poet Amir Khusrow. He draws the audience closer, with renditions of lyrics by Amir Khusro and Sufi Kalam, explaining the meaning of the poetry behind a devotee's yearning for god.

He performed on Idea Jalsa on Doordarshan, Times festival and Pandit Motiram Pandit Maniram Sangeet Samaroh organised by Pandit Jasraj.Also he has performed with Kailash Kher

Awards and recognition
Munnawar Masoom was given the title, Fakr-e-Madhya Pradesh by Government of Madhya Pradesh.

References

Indian qawwali singers
Real World Records artists
People from Madhya Pradesh
Year of birth missing (living people)
Living people